Natham R. Viswanathan (born 11 December 1949) is an Indian politician and deputy general secretary of All India Anna Dravida Munnetra Kazhagam. He is a member of the Tamil Nadu Legislative Assembly from Natham Constituency. He was the Minister for Electricity and Prohibition and Excise, Govt. of Tamil Nadu. Previously, he was elected to the Tamil Nadu legislative assembly as an Anna Dravida Munnetra Kazhagam candidate from Natham constituency in 1999 after the death of then legislative member of Natham, M. Andi Ambalam. He has won consecutively in 2001, 2006 and 2011 elections in a landslide vote count and has a cult following.

References 

1949 births
Living people
All India Anna Dravida Munnetra Kazhagam politicians
State cabinet ministers of Tamil Nadu
Tamil Nadu MLAs 2021–2026